The Roman Catholic Diocese of Patos de Minas is a diocese located in the city of Patos de Minas in the Ecclesiastical province of Uberaba in Brazil.

History
 5 April 1955: Established as Diocese of Patos de Minas from the Diocese of Uberaba

Bishops
 Bishops of Patos de Minas (Roman rite)
 Bishop José André Coimbra (1955.06.08 – 1968.08.16)
 Bishop Jorge Scarso, O.F.M. Cap. (1968.12.28 – 1992.01.08)
 Bishop João Bosco Oliver de Faria (1992.01.08 – 2007.05.30), appointed Archbishop of Diamantina, Minas Gerais
 Bishop Cláudio Nori Sturm, O.F.M. Cap. (2008.10.08 - present)

Coadjutor bishop
José Belvino do Nascimento (1987-1989), did not succeed to see; appointed Bishop of Divinópolis, Minas Gerais

Auxiliary bishop
Jorge Scarso, O.F.M. Cap. (1967-1968), appointed Bishop here

Other priests of this diocese who became bishops
Paulo Sérgio Machado, appointed Bishop of Ituiutaba, Minas Gerais in 1989
José Moreira de Melo, appointed Bishop of Itapeva, Sao PauloPriest in 1996

References

 GCatholic.org
 Catholic Hierarchy
 Diocese website  

Roman Catholic dioceses in Brazil
Christian organizations established in 1955
Patos de Minas, Roman Catholic Diocese of
Roman Catholic dioceses and prelatures established in the 20th century
1955 establishments in Brazil